Villers may refer to:

Places

In France
Villers, Loire, in the Loire département 
Villers, Vosges, in the Vosges département
Villers-Agron-Aiguizy, in the Aisne département 
Villers-Allerand, in the Marne département
Villers-au-Bois, in the Pas-de-Calais département 
Villers-au-Flos, in the Pas-de-Calais département
Villers-au-Tertre, in the Nord département 
Villers-aux-Bois, in the Marne département 
Villers-aux-Érables, in the Somme département 
Villers-aux-Nœuds, in the Marne département
Villers-aux-Vents, in the Meuse département 
Villers-Bocage, Calvados, in the Calvados département
Villers-Bocage, Somme, in the Somme département 
Villers-Bouton, in the Haute-Saône département   
Villers-Bretonneux, in the Somme département 
Villers-Brûlin, in the Pas-de-Calais département 
Villers-Buzon, in the Doubs département 
Villers-Campsart, in the Somme département
Villers-Canivet, in the Calvados département 
Villers-Carbonnel, in the Somme département
Villers-Cernay, in the Ardennes département 
Villers-Châtel, in the Pas-de-Calais département
Villers-Chemin-et-Mont-lès-Étrelles, in the Haute-Saône département 
Villers-Chief, in the Doubs département 
Villers-Cotterêts, in the Aisne département 
Villers-devant-Dun, in the Meuse département
Villers-devant-le-Thour, in the Ardennes département 
Villers-devant-Mouzon, in the Ardennes département
Villers-Écalles, in the Seine-Maritime département 
Villers-en-Argonne, in the Marne département 
Villers-en-Arthies, in the Val-d'Oise département 
Villers-en-Cauchies, in the Nord département 
Villers-en-Haye, in the Meurthe-et-Moselle département 
Villers-en-Ouche, in the Orne département
Villers-en-Prayères, in the Aisne département 
Villers-en-Vexin, in the Eure département
Villers-Farlay, in the Jura département 
Villers-Faucon, in the Somme département
Villers-Franqueux, in the Marne département 
Villers-Grélot, in the Doubs département 
Villers-Guislain, in the Nord département 
Villers-Hélon, in the Aisne département
Villers-la-Chèvre, in the Meurthe-et-Moselle département  
Villers-la-Combe, in the Doubs département
Villers-la-Faye, in the Côte-d'Or département 
Villers-la-Montagne, in the Meurthe-et-Moselle département   
Villers-la-Ville, Haute-Saône, in the Haute-Saône département 
Villers-le-Château, in the Marne département 
Villers-le-Lac, in the Doubs département 
Villers-le-Rond, in the Meurthe-et-Moselle département
Villers-les-Bois, in the Jura département 
Villers-lès-Cagnicourt, in the Pas-de-Calais département
Villers-le-Sec, Aisne, in the Aisne département 
Villers-le-Sec, Marne, in the Marne département
Villers-le-Sec, Meuse, in the Meuse département 
Villers-le-Sec, Haute-Saône, in the Haute-Saône département 
Villers-lès-Guise, in the Aisne département 
Villers-lès-Luxeuil, in the Haute-Saône département
Villers-lès-Mangiennes, in the Meuse département 
Villers-lès-Moivrons, in the Meurthe-et-Moselle département
Villers-lès-Nancy, in the Meurthe-et-Moselle département 
Villers-les-Ormes, in the Indre département 
Villers-les-Pots, in the Côte-d'Or département 
Villers-lès-Roye, in the Somme département 
Villers-le-Tilleul, in the Ardennes département 
Villers-le-Tourneur, in the Ardennes département
Villers-l'Hôpital, in the Pas-de-Calais département 
Villers-Marmery, in the Marne département
Villers-Outréaux, in the Nord département 
Villers-Pater, in the Haute-Saône département
Villers-Patras, in the Côte-d'Or département 
Villers-Plouich, in the Nord département 
Villers-Pol, in the Nord département 
Villers-Robert, in the Jura département
Villers-Rotin, in the Côte-d'Or département 
Villers-Saint-Barthélemy, in the Oise département
Villers-Saint-Christophe, in the Aisne département 
Villers-Saint-Frambourg, in the Oise département   
Villers-Saint-Genest, in the Oise département 
Villers-Saint-Martin, in the Doubs département 
Villers-Saint-Paul, in the Oise département 
Villers-Saint-Sépulcre, in the Oise département
Villers-Semeuse, in the Ardennes département 
Villers-Sire-Nicole, in the Nord département
Villers-Sir-Simon, in the Pas-de-Calais département 
Villers-sous-Ailly, in the Somme département
Villers-sous-Chalamont, in the Doubs département 
Villers-sous-Châtillon, in the Marne département 
Villers-sous-Foucarmont, in the Seine-Maritime département 
Villers-sous-Montrond, in the Doubs département
Villers-sous-Pareid, in the Meuse département
Villers-sous-Prény, in the Meurthe-et-Moselle département 
Villers-sous-Saint-Leu, in the Oise département
Villers-Stoncourt, in the Moselle département 
Villers-sur-Auchy, in the Oise département 
Villers-sur-Authie, in the Somme département 
Villers-sur-Bar, in the Ardennes département
Villers-sur-Bonnières, in the Oise département 
Villers-sur-Coudun, in the Oise département
Villers-sur-Fère, in the Aisne département 
Villers-sur-le-Mont, in the Ardennes département
Villers-sur-le-Roule, in the Eure département 
Villers-sur-Mer, in the Calvados département 
Villers-sur-Meuse, in the Meuse département 
Villers-sur-Nied, in the Moselle département
Villers-sur-Port, in the Haute-Saône département 
Villers-sur-Saulnot, in the Haute-Saône département
Villers-sur-Trie, in the Oise département 
Villers-Tournelle, in the Somme département   
Villers-Vaudey, in the Haute-Saône département 
Villers-Vermont, in the Oise département 
Villers-Vicomte, in the Oise département

In Belgium

Villers-la-Ville, a municipality of Walloon Brabant
Villers-Sainte-Gertrude, a village in the province of Luxembourg

People
André Villers (1930–2016), French photographer and artist
Charles de Villers (1765–1815), French philosopher
Charles Joseph de Villers (1724–1810), French naturalist
Charles de Villers (1765–1815), French philosopher
Marie-Denise Villers (1774–1821), French painter
Sir John Villers (1485/6–1544), English politician
Philippe Villers, French-American entrepreneur
Raido Villers (born 1982), Estonian professional basketballer

See also
Villiers (disambiguation)